Katherine Hamilton, Duchess of Abercorn,  (born Hon. Mary Katherine Crichton; 8 July 1905 – 2 February 1990)
was Mistress of the Robes to Queen Elizabeth The Queen Mother from 1964 until the Duchess's death in 1990. She was invested as a Dame Commander of the Royal Victorian Order in 1969. She received the Queen Elizabeth II Version of the Royal Household Long and Faithful Service Medal in 1984 for 20 years service to the Royal Family.

The Duchess was the elder of the two surviving children born to Henry Crichton, Viscount Crichton, son of John Crichton, 4th Earl Erne, and Lady Mary Cavendish Grosvenor, daughter of Hugh Grosvenor, 1st Duke of Westminster. She was married in St Martin-in-the-Fields, on 9 February 1928, to James Hamilton (at that time Marquess of Hamilton), who succeeded his father as 4th Duke of Abercorn in 1953.

References

1905 births
1990 deaths
British duchesses by marriage
Dames Grand Cross of the Royal Victorian Order
Mistresses of the Robes to Queen Elizabeth The Queen Mother